Sari Aghol may refer to:
 Sari Aghol, East Azerbaijan
 Sari Aghol, Zanjan